Houwerzijl is a small village in the Netherlands; it is located in the municipality of Het Hogeland, Groningen. 

Houwerzijl was located on the edge of land and water. Three terps (artificial hills) were built south of the current village, and were one of the oldest in Groningen. The hills contained fertile soil, and large parts have been excavated, and only fragments remain.

It was first mentioned in 1347 as Fredericus de Howersyle. The name means the lock (zijl) of the estate (Houw) of Fredericus. The lock was demolished in 1728, because it was no longer needed, and only the house of the operator remains.

The Theefabriek is a tea museum and tearoom in the village.

Gallery

References

External links 
 
 Houwerzijl, website with information about the village

Het Hogeland
Populated places in Groningen (province)